The Caribbean Scout Jamboree is a periodic gathering for Boy Scouts in the Caribbean, held at intervals since 1952, when the First Caribbean Jamboree was held at Briggs Park, in Kingston, Jamaica. Past Jamborees include:

List of Caribbean Scout Jamborees

Caribbean Cuboree

The Caribbean Cuboree is an event for Cub Scouts living in the Caribbean. It is held every three years and lasts for several days.

Dates, locations and themes

4th - 1985  - Grenada
9th - 2001 - Barbados
10th - 2004 -  Grenada - Cubs in Spice, Expanding Horizons
11th - 2007 - Trinidad and Tobago
12th - 2010 - Curaçao - The Incredible Supercub in the Jungle City

References

 Patches and memorabilia of the Caribbean Scout Jamborees

See also

 Scouting and Guiding in Guyana

Scouting jamborees